The M5 Motorway is a  motorway located in Sydney, New South Wales that is part of the Sydney Orbital Network. 

The M5 route number comprises two connected parts:
The South–West Motorway is a toll road operated by Interlink Roads. Its southwestern terminus is south of the Roden Cutler Interchange in Prestons where the M5 meets the M7 Motorway and the M31 Motorway. The section between Hammondville and Beverly Hills is tolled under the M5 South-West tolls.
The section west of Marsh Street is tolled since July 2020.

The M8 Motorway also runs roughly parallel to the M5 East and link the M5 at Kingsgrove to the St Peters Interchange along separate twin tunnels. Both the M5 East and M8 are tolled as part of WestConnex, separate to the M5 South-West tolls. This results in two separate tolls when travelling along the M5 between Moorebank and Kyeemagh.

The M5 cycleway is located on the breakdown lanes of the M5 South-West Motorway, and runs off-road parallel to the M5 East between King Georges Road and Arncliffe.

Sections

South-West Motorway 

In the 1980s, the Hume Highway (National Highway 31) ended at Crossroads, just before Liverpool. This stretch of freeway (Campbelltown to Crossroads) was previously known as South Western Freeway, designated F5. It is important to note that the South Western Freeway is different to the M5 South-West Motorway. From then on, to proceed to the city, the alternatives were either Liverpool Road (then National Route 31) or Newbridge Road (State Route 54) via Bankstown. Both routes had many traffic lights and were and still are frequently heavily congested.

An initial stretch of the motorway was built and completed in February 1985 to link Heathcote Road at Moorebank and the Hume Highway at Casula, including a bridge across the Georges River near Casula. It was built as a single carriageway and included a traffic light controlled, at-grade intersection at Moorebank Avenue.

After years of proposals and political promises, a privately constructed and operated motorway – the M5 South-West Motorway – was built under a "Build-Operate-Transfer" agreement, which was awarded to Interlink Roads. The motorway was constructed on a publicly owned freeway reservation, between the existing road at Heathcote Road, Moorebank, to King Georges Road, Beverly Hills. It was constructed in two stages:
 Stage 1: between Hume Highway and The River Road
 Stage 2: between The River Road and King Georges Road, Sydney

Stage 1 and a portion of Stage 2 (The River Road to Fairford Road) of the motorway opened in August 1992, with the remaining portion of Stage 2 opened in October 1992. The motorway was "completed" months ahead of schedule, even though the proposed link between the Cross Roads and Casula (Casula bypass) had yet to be constructed, and a third of the "motorway" existed only as single-carriageway road between the Fairford Road and King Georges Road interchanges, remarkably located at the busier city end of the road.

Under the original contract in 1991, Interlink Roads would operate and toll the motorway for a concession of 22 years after opening. This meant that the toll concession was scheduled to end in August 2014.

Metroad 5 was introduced in late 1992 along with other Metroads and was signed in February 1993. The South-West Motorway from Beverly Hills to Moorebank and Crossroads to Campbelltown, along with Hume Highway from Moorebank to Crossroads, were allocated Metroad 5. The Casula bypass opened in June 1994, the Hume Highway section of Metroad 5 was realigned to the bypass and the entire South-West Motorway therefore had the route allocation of Metroad 5. As part of the Casula bypass works, the toll concession was extended from August 2014 to June 2022.

As part of the construction of the M5 East, the eastern single-laned section of the South-West Motorway was widened to a full 4 lanes between June 1997 and August 1999, finally bringing most of the M5 up to complete freeway standard. This also included the opening of east-facing ramps and toll plazas at The River Road and Fairford Road. However, the at-grade intersection at Moorebank Avenue still remained, posing a constraint on traffic flow. In January 2003, the new, completely grade separated interchange at Moorebank Avenue was completed, meaning that not only the entire length of Metroad 5 was now freeway standard but also the entire route from Canberra to Sydney, and Melbourne to Sydney, is now high-speed dual carriageway. However, the toll concession was also extended from June 2022 to August 2023.

With the completion of the Westlink M7 motorway in December 2005, the Roden Cutler Interchange was added at Prestons to allow traffic from the south to access western Sydney or bypass the city altogether.

Between 2012 and 2014, the motorway was widened to three lanes in each direction. As part of widening works, the toll concession was extended for the third time to 10 December 2026.

New eastward-facing ramps at Belmore Road were constructed and opened on 5 February 2019.

Toll
The ownership of M5 South-West Motorway is split between the state government and Interlink Roads, 100% owned by Transurban. The state government owns the section between Hume Highway and Heathcote Road, with Interlink Roads owning the remainder of the motorway including the Casula Bypass. However, the Casula Bypass is not tolled.

Interlink Roads was initially equally owned by Leighton and Commonwealth Bank. Leighton sold its 50% shareholding to Macquarie Infrastructure Group (MIG) in December 1996, while Commonwealth Bank sold 34.6% of its shareholding to Utilities Trust of Australia and its remaining 15.4% shareholding to AMP Limited in December 1998. AMP in turn sold some of its shareholding to Retail Employees Superannuation and Sunsuper in 1999.

Sydney Roads Group was spun off from Macquarie Infrastructure Group in June 2006, including its 50% stake in Interlink Roads. Transurban first acquired ownership of Interlink Roads in April 2007 when it acquired Sydney Roads Group. By 2012, the shareholders of Interlink Roads were:
 Transurban (50%)
 Utilities Trust of Australia (UTA) (19.23%)
 IFM Investors (15.38%)
 BNP Paribas Nominees Pty Ltd (8.24%), formerly known as Cogent Nominees Pty Ltd (2002–2012) and AMP Nominees Pty Ltd (prior to 2002)
 State Street Corporation, as trustees of Retail Employees Superannuation Trust (REST Super) (4.4%) and Sunsuper Superannuation Fund (2.75%)

Transurban gained majority control of Interlink Roads when it acquired BNP's 8.24% stake on 18 September 2018, before acquiring the 7.14% stakes from REST Super and Sunsuper on 3 December 2018, increasing its shareholding to 65.38%. Transurban acquired the remaining 34.62% stake from IFM and Utilities Trust of Australia on 30 October 2019.

The motorway east of Heathcote Road is tolled by Interlink Roads at a single price, with toll gantries located at Hammondville and at east-facing ramps at Henry Lawson Drive, The River Road, Fairford Road and Belmore Road. The motorway is tolled separately to the M5 East. Regular users of the motorway can claim a rebate from the state government for the cost of the toll, excluding GST, as part of a 1995 election commitment by Bob Carr, who eventually won the election and became Premier of New South Wales. On 1 July 2013, the M5 South-West became the last motorway in Australia to convert to cashless tolling.

The current toll concession held by Interlink Roads is due to expire on 10 December 2026, after it was extended for three times since opening. As part of the acquisition of WestConnex by a Transurban-led consortium, the M5 South-West will be transferred to WestConnex ownership when the Interlink Roads concession ends in 2026. The M5 South-West will then be tolled as part of WestConnex together with M5 East.

M5 East 

The M5 East is the eastern section of the M5 between King Georges Road and General Holmes Drive at Mascot, and includes two stretches of tunnel, a 4 km tunnel between Kingsgrove and Arncliffe, and another tunnel under the Cooks River.

After the Casula bypass from the Cross Roads and Casula was completed in 1994, the M5 South-West Motorway still abruptly ended at King Georges Road, meaning that motorway traffic was forced onto congested roads to complete the journey into the city. Roads & Traffic Authority (RTA) released the Environmental Impact Assessment of the M5 East Motorway for public consultation in June 1994, which proposed:
 Duplicating the existing single-lane M5 South-West Motorway (opened 1992) between Fairford Road and King Georges Road
 New tolled motorway between King Georges Road and General Holmes Drive at Mascot, adjacent to Sydney Airport, including tunnels between Bexley North and Turrella and a viaduct between Turrella and Marsh Street
 An overpass over King Georges Road, with the embankment to be filled by spoil from the tunnel excavation
The toll plaza was proposed to be located near Garema Circuit, Armitree Street and Glamis Street in Kingsgrove.

Many of the public submissions raised during the EIS consultation were concerned with the visual impact of the proposed elevated motorway through Turrella, and the impact on residences in Arncliffe. In response to comments, it was announced in August 1995 that RTA would examine alternatives to the proposal between Bexley Road and Cooks River. In December 1996, an alternative direct tunnel proposal was announced in a supplement report to the EIS (EIS supplement), which was exhibited for public consultation until February 1997. The alternative proposal proposed shorter and more direct tunnels between Bexley Road and Marsh Street. There would also be no tolls imposed on the motorway, as announced by the Minister for Roads a month prior. The proposed toll plaza would then be used as heavy vehicle inspection areas instead.

In response to submissions during the EIS supplement consultation, the proposal was further modified, reverting to an underpass below King Georges Road and a tunnel underneath Cooks River. The modified proposal was approved in November 1997 and would be built as a publicly-built and toll-free link known as the M5 East Freeway. Construction commenced in August 1998 and the M5 East was opened on 9 December 2001.

Controversy surrounded the construction of the M5 East concerning the effect of the freeway on the local environment, especially upon parts of Wolli Creek, and the construction of ventilation stacks required to remove pollution from the tunnel, which, ostensibly due to cost, lack filtration systems. Since its opening, the M5 East has attracted criticism for its lack of capacity, being full from the day it was opened, given that the tunnels provide only two lanes of traffic in either direction, and no provision has been made for future expansion. Most congestion problems occur at the western end of the main tunnel, which is long and steep.

An addition lane for slow traffic begins at the western tunnel exit for a short distance, to remove slow and heavy traffic. Had this been extended into the tunnel for a few hundred metres, the capacity would be far greater. These steep entrances to the tunnelled section are also the site of frequent vehicle accidents, usually involving heavy traffic. Pollution and smog inside the tunnel has also been a major concern, after it was revealed that the New South Wales Department of Health advised the New South Wales Roads and Traffic Authority that pollution levels in the tunnel exceeded acceptable limits during peak hours of use, and urged motorists using the tunnel to keep their windows up and putting their car's ventilation system on "recirculate".

The M5 East has been beset by many closures, due to accidents and computer failures within the tunnel, which cause gridlock. Between 2002 and 2008 there were six closures attributed to technical and computer failures alone in the tunnel. The Government of New South Wales must pay penalties to the operators of the M5 East, BHBB, due to more traffic using the M5 than originally forecast. The penalties were expected to amount to $13 million by 2011. Some of this increase in demand was caused by the State Government's "Cashback" scheme, which involves public money subsidising motorists for using the adjoining, tolled M5 South-West Motorway.

Between December 2011 and April 2020, the M5 East was operated and maintained by Leighton (and later Ventia) on behalf of Transport for NSW. On 1 May 2020, WestConnex took over the operations and maintenance of the tunnels. Following the commencement of tolls in July 2020, the M5 East ceased being a freeway.

New M5

In 2009, the government released the M5 Transport Corridor Feasibility Study, which investigated strategic options for improving the M5 Motorway corridor. The study identified a preliminary preferred option, being the M5 East Duplication, consisted of duplicating the M5 East and construction of a new connection from the M5 East at Arncliffe to Euston Road, Qantas Drive and Gardeners Road. The strategic concept for the M5 East Duplication was placed on public exhibition between November 2009 and March 2010 for community and stakeholder feedback. Feedback received was used to further develop and refine the scheme. In 2012, the scheme become the King Georges Road Interchange Upgrade and New M5 projects, the second stage of WestConnex. The New M5 would consist of separate tunnels parallel to the M5 East tunnels and would later become known as M8 Motorway.

The M8 tunnels were completed in July 2020. The tunnels connect to the existing M5 East at Kingsgrove and run roughly parallel to M5 East to St Peters Interchange near the airport. The road then connects with the M4-M8 Link to form an inner CBD bypass.

Toll

Since 5 July 2020, when the M8 tunnels opened, majority of the M5 East between King Georges Road and Marsh Street, as well as the M8, is tolled by distance travelled as part of the WestConnex. A short section of the M5 East between Marsh Street and General Holmes Drive remains toll-free. As both the M5 East and M8 are tolled under WestConnex, a vehicle travelling on the M5 East (between King Georges Road and M8) and M8 together will only incur a single toll.

The M5 East and M8 toll charge consists of:
a flagfall
a charge per kilometre
Tolls for heavy vehicles are triple of cars and motorcycles. Toll prices increase by 4% or the consumer price index (CPI) every year, whichever is greater, until 2040, after which CPI will apply.

Route numbering

Metroad 5 
From its inception in 1992 until alphanumeric route numbers were introduced to New South Wales in 2013, the M5 motorway carried the Metroad 5 shield. However Metroad 5 and the M5 were not synonymous. The original Metroad 5 route commenced at the Hume Highway at Casula, before following the original extent of the M5 South-West Motorway, and then following King Georges Road, Hume Highway and Parramatta Road into the city. In 1994, the Metroad 5 route was moved onto the new Casula Bypass section of the M5, and 1998 it was extended significantly to the southwest via Hume Highway to meet Metroad 9 near Campbelltown (replacing what was previously National Highway 31). Finally in 2001 with the opening of the M5 East Freeway, the Metroad 5 route was changed significantly to follow the new motorway to meet Metroad 1 near the airport instead of travelling to the city.

With the introduction of alphanumeric route numbers in 2013, most of the Metroad 5 route was transitioned to route M5. However the Hume Highway section (Campbelltown to Prestons) has reverted to the updated incarnation of its previous marker, as part of the M31 Hume Motorway.

Exits and interchanges

See also 

 Freeways in Australia
 Freeways in Sydney

References

External links 
M5 South-West Motorway Official website of the M5 South-West Motorway
M5 East Official website of M5 East - WestConnex
M5 East Live Air Quality Data Current Air Quality readings from the M5 East ventilation stacks.
M5 East PM10 Graphs Graphs of particulate Air Qualify from the M5 East ventilation stacks for the past 24hours.
Historical Air Quality Data Historical particulate Air Quality from the M5 East ventilation stacks.
RTA Webcam (Liverpool)
RTA Webcam (Beverly Hills)

Highways in Sydney
Toll roads in Australia
Tunnels in Sydney
Road tunnels in Australia
Georges River Council
Georges River